Harry Edwards may refer to:

 Harry Edwards (Australian footballer) (born 2000), Australian rules footballer 
 Harry Edwards (director) (1889–1952), Canadian-born American director/writer at Columbia Pictures
 Henry Edwards (entomologist) (1827–1891), English-born actor, writer and butterfly scientist, known as "Harry"
 Harry Edwards (English footballer) (1870–after 1899), English association footballer of the 1890s
 Harry Edwards (healer) (1893–1976), spiritual healer
 Harry Edwards (politician) (1927–2012), Australian politician
 Harry Edwards (sociologist) (born 1942), American professor, author, and civil rights activist
 Harry Edwards (trade unionist) (1874–1958), British trade union activist
 Harry Stillwell Edwards (1855–1938), American journalist, novelist, and poet
 Harry T. Edwards (born 1940), U.S. court of appeals judge

See also 
 Harold Edwards (disambiguation)
 Harry Edward (1898–1973), British Olympic runner
 Henry Edwards (disambiguation)